is a Japanese manga series written and illustrated by Mami Kashiwabara. The manga was serialized between the November 2005 and September 2011 issues of Kodansha's Monthly Afternoon manga magazine, and was collected into 10 tankōbon volumes. A 12-episode anime adaptation by Studio Comet and directed by Shinji Takamatsu aired in Japan between July and September 2009.

Plot
Sora no Manimani revolves around Saku Ōyagi, a bookworm who moves back to the town he lived in as a child after seven years. He had a childhood friend named Mihoshi Akeno who loved astronomy and would always take Saku outside against his will to look at the stars, or do other outdoor activities, whereas Saku would rather have stayed inside with his books. Saku broke his arm the day he moved away after trying to catch Mihoshi falling out of a tree; Saku resented her for this, and that she never saw him off. However, this was a misunderstanding since he was too stubborn to listen to the whole story (the fall had put her in the hospital so she could not see him off), and later becomes friends with Mihoshi again after they meet attending the same high school. Mihoshi convinces Saku to join the astronomy club she is a member of, despite Saku actually wanting to join literature club instead. Hime Makita, a girl in Saku's class who has a crush on him, also joins the astronomy club.

Characters

Saku is the main protagonist for this story, who grew up traveling around Japan due to his father constantly changing jobs. Saku loves to read books and can often be seen reading, whether it be on the bus, at school, or at home. He generally likes to stay indoors and read, but after joining the astronomy club, he starts to enjoy going out and stargazing or participating in other club activities. As Fumie notes, his writing skills are top notch, making him better suited for the literature club. While he is constantly annoyed by Mihoshi, he does enjoy her company. However, because of how Mihoshi shows up to his class a lot, many of his classmates believe that they are dating (much to the dismay of Hime and Saku).

Mihoshi is a cheerful girl who is a childhood friend of Saku's though she is one year older than him and has a tendency to act childish. She is very enthusiastic about and has a strong love for all things astronomy, an interest she learned about from her late father. She has always enjoyed going outside and stargazing or doing other activities, and would usually drag Saku along with her, often against his will. She is thrilled to be reunited with Saku and convinces him to join the astronomy club at their school. She becomes the club president after Roma graduates.

Sayo is a calm and intelligent girl who is in the same year as Mihoshi and is also a member of the astronomy club. Her family runs a Buddhist temple.

Hime is a girl who is in the same class as Saku, whom she has a crush on. After Saku joins the astronomy club, she quickly follows suit so as to spend more time closer to him and getting to know him. She had originally met Saku briefly on the bus before taking their entrance exam for the school, and was surprised to see him again in her class. She is generally a calm girl though is known to get jealous of Mihoshi when she is sticking close to Saku. Though she has a crush on Saku, she is easily put off by other guys trying to make advances on her. Hime's hair gets frizzy in high-humidity weather, and her sister can use this trait to gauge the humidity in the air.

Masashi Edogawa is one of Saku's classmates and friend, and while he often takes part in astronomy club activities, is actually a member of the photography club. He enjoys hanging around the astronomy club because of Mihoshi, Sayo and Hime, whom he sees as all very attractive, and is jealous that Saku is surrounded by beautiful girls. However, he also enjoys astronomy and actively participates in stargazing events. His photography skills tend to come in handy in promoting the astronomy club.

Takeyasu Roma is the president of the astronomy club. He has always had a poor constitution and as such is generally very weak and often spits up blood or passes out after doing something straining. He has an intense love of astronomy, akin to Mihoshi's own enthusiasm. After graduating, he goes to college with Ayumi Ōmi, a girl with the same passion for astronomy as him, and who has a crush on him.

Fumie is the student council president and also a member of the literature club, where she often takes charge of club events despite not being the club president. She notices how Saku also enjoys books and reading and has invited him to join the literature club on multiple occasions. She admires Saku's writing skills and develops an interest in him. She feels that the astronomy club and its members are not what a club should be and is generally not favorable about their activities. She has known Mihoshi for several years and feels animosity towards her. She has terrible eyesight and has trouble distinguishing objects and people without her glasses on.

Media

Manga
The manga, written and illustrated by Mami Kashiwabara, was serialized in Kodansha's Monthly Afternoon between the November 2005 and September 2011 issues. It was collected into 10 tankōbon volumes released in Japan between June 23, 2006 and September 23, 2011.

Anime

A 12-episode anime adaptation animated by Studio Comet and directed by Shinji Takamatsu aired in Japan between July 7 and September 22, 2009. Two pieces of theme music are used for the episodes; one opening theme and one ending theme.

References

External links
Anime official website 

2005 manga
School life in anime and manga
Seinen manga